Wills Township may refer to:

Wills Township, LaPorte County, Indiana
Wills Township, Guernsey County, Ohio

See also

Will Township, Will County, Illinois
Wills (disambiguation)

Township name disambiguation pages